The Plzeň municipal election in 2018 was held as part of 2018 Czech municipal elections on 5 and 6 October 2018. Plzeň was led by a coalition of the Civic Democratic Party, Czech Social Democratic Party, Christian and Democratic Union – Czechoslovak People's Party and Citizens Patriots. ANO 2011 was the strongest opposition party. ANO 2011 has won the popular vote but tied with the Civic Democratic Party by number of seats. Coalition formed after the election was formed on 15 October 2018 consisting ANO 2011, Civic Democratic Party, TOP 09 and Czech Social Democratic Party. Martin Baxa became the new Mayor.

Background
The previous election was held in 2014. ANO 2011 tied with the Civic Democratic Party (ODS) and Czech Social Democratic Party (ČSSD). ODS and ČSSD then formed a coalition and Martin Zrzavecký became the new Mayor. ANO 2011 remained in opposition. The coalition between ODS and ČSSD also included Citizens Patriots (OPAT) and Christian and Democratic Union – Czechoslovak People's Party (KDU–ČSL). The leader of local ANO 2011 Pavel Šrámek resigned his positions in regional organisation following the election.

The Czech Pirate Party was the first party to introduce its leader. Pavel Bosák won the party's primaries and became candidate for Mayor. Bosák stated that he wants to thank pirates for his chance and that he wants to introduce his vision for the city to its citizens. Bosák isn't a member of the party.

The first opinion poll was published on 24 April 2018. Seven parties would be elected to assembly. ANO 2011 would receive 24% of votes and while the Civic Democratic Party would receive 12.7% of votes. The Pirate party would come third with 10%. The Social Democratic Party would be fourth with 9.6%. TOP 09 and The Communist Party would both receive 7%. Far-right Freedom and Direct Democracy would receive 8%.

Roman zarzycký became nominee of ANO 2011 for the position of Mayor. ODS decided to nominate Martin Baxa.

Current composition of assembly

Opinion polls

Result

References

External links

2018
2018 elections in the Czech Republic